Lloyd "Tiny" Grimes (July 7, 1916 – March 4, 1989) was an American jazz and R&B guitarist. He was a member of the Art Tatum Trio from 1943 to 1944, was a backing musician on recording sessions, and later led his own bands, including a recording session with Charlie Parker. He is notable for playing the electric tenor guitar, a four-stringed instrument.

Biography
Grimes was born in Newport News, Virginia, United States, and began his musical career playing drums and one-fingered piano. In 1938 he took up the electric four-string tenor guitar. In 1940 he joined the Cats and the Fiddle as guitarist and singer. In 1943 he joined the Art Tatum Trio as guitarist and made a number of recordings with Tatum.

After leaving Tatum, Grimes recorded with his own groups in New York and with a long list of leading musicians, including vocalist Billie Holiday. He made four recordings with his own group, augmented with Charlie Parker: "Tiny's Tempo", "Red Cross", "Romance Without Finance", and "I'll Always Love You Just the Same", the latter two featuring Grimes' singing.

In the late 1940s, he had a hit on a jazzed-up version of "Loch Lomond", with the band billed as Tiny "Mac" Grimes and the Rocking Highlanders and appearing in kilts. This group included tenor saxman Red Prysock and singer Screaming Jay Hawkins. Grimes continued to lead his own groups into the later 1970s and he recorded on Prestige Records in a series of strong blues-based performances with Coleman Hawkins, Illinois Jacquet, Pepper Adams, Roy Eldridge and other noted players including, in 1977, Earl Hines.

With Paul Williams, he co-headlined the first Moondog Coronation Ball, promoted by Alan Freed in Cleveland, Ohio, on March 21, 1952, often claimed as the first rock and roll concert. In 1953 he may have played on the Crows one-hit wonder, "Gee", that has been called the first original rock and roll record by an R&B group.

Grimes died in March 1989 in New York City from meningitis at the age of 72.

Discography 

 Blues Groove with Coleman Hawkins (Prestige, 1958)
 Callin' the Blues with J. C. Higginbotham (Prestige, 1958)
 Tiny in Swingville with Jerome Richardson (Prestige, 1959)
 Hawk Eyes with Coleman Hawkins, Charlie Shavers (Prestige, 1959)
 Big Time Guitar with Organ and Rhythm (United Artists, 1962)
 Guitar Soul with Kenny Burrell, Bill Jennings (Status, 1965)
 Tiny Grimes (Black and Blue, 1970)
 Profoundly Blue  (Muse, 1973)
 Some Groovy Fours (Black and Blue, 1974)
 One Is Never Too Old to Swing with Roy Eldridge (Sonet, 1977)

References

External links 
Biography
Review of singles by Tiny Grimes Quintet

 
 

1916 births
1989 deaths
American jazz guitarists
American rhythm and blues guitarists
American male guitarists
African-American guitarists
Guitarists from Virginia
United Records artists
Atlantic Records artists
Prestige Records artists
Muse Records artists
Musicians from Newport News, Virginia
Neurological disease deaths in New York (state)
Infectious disease deaths in New York (state)
Deaths from meningitis
Apollo Records artists
20th-century American guitarists
Jazz musicians from Virginia
20th-century American male musicians
American male jazz musicians
Black & Blue Records artists
Sonet Records artists
20th-century African-American musicians